Carlsruhe is the name of several locations:

Karlsruhe, a city in Germany (Karlsruhe was formerly Carlsruhe)
Carlsruhe, South Australia, a locality in South Australia, Australia
Carlsruhe, Victoria, a town in Victoria, Australia
Carlsruhe O/S and Bad Carlsruhe, German names of the village Pokój in Poland